Sieneke Ashley Kristel Baum-Peeters (born 1 April 1992) is a Dutch singer. She performed the Dutch entry at the Eurovision Song Contest 2010 semi-final.

Sieneke released an album with six covers of songs from the 1980s, called It's My Dream, in 2007. Besides her singing career, she is a trained hairstylist.

Eurovision

In 2010, Sieneke performed in the Dutch Nationaal Songfestival 2010 for the Eurovision Song Contest 2010, with all participants performing their own version of the song "Ik ben verliefd (Sha-la-lie)". The Dutch audience was surprised that there was no public vote for this year's Songfestival; instead, the winner was selected by 3 jury members. Sieneke won with 2 points, with Pierre Kartner reluctantly giving the deciding vote. Sieneke represented the Netherlands in the Eurovision Song Contest 2010 in Oslo, Norway, on May 27, but did not qualify for the final.

References

External links 

 Sieneke's website

1992 births
Living people
Eurovision Song Contest entrants for the Netherlands
People from Nijmegen
Eurovision Song Contest entrants of 2010
21st-century Dutch singers
21st-century Dutch women singers
Nationaal Songfestival contestants